CH2 could refer to:

CH2, a postcode district in the CH postcode area
Council House 2, an office building in Melbourne, Australia
CH2, the molecular formula of several chemical entities: see Methylene (disambiguation)